Thwaite Priory was a monastery at Welton le Marsh in Lincolnshire, England.  It was a house of Augustinian Canons Regular, dependent on Thornton Abbey, founded before 1440 and thought to have been dissolved before 1536.

Part of the remains were incorporated into an 18th-century cottage named Thwaite Hall.  It is now a Grade II listed building.

References

External links 

Monasteries in Lincolnshire
Augustinian monasteries in England